Kim was released in early 2009, and is a Kim Fransson studio album. and his debut album.

Track listing
3 Floors Down (K. Fransson, A. Bagge, F. Hallström, Andreas Carlsson) 
Kiss And Make Up (K. Fransson, A. Bagge, F. Hallström, Andreas Carlsson)
Let That Feeling Grow (K. Fransson, F. Hallström, Andreas Carlsson)
The Hardest Lesson (D. Child, A. Carlsson, K. Fransson, A. Bagge)
Another State of Mind (K. Fransson, F. Hallström, Andreas Carlsson)
Man in the Moon (K. Fransson, F. Hallström)
Here Comes the Night (K. Fransson, A. Bagge, F. Hallström, Andreas Carlsson)

Chart positions

References 

2009 debut albums
Kim Fransson albums